Goropeke is a small settlement on a hill immediately south of Žiri in the Upper Carniola region of Slovenia.

Name
Goropeke was attested in written sources as Ragopetsch in 1291 and Gorapetzi in 1500. The original name has been reconstructed as *Rogopeke, an accusative plural of the common noun compound *rogopek (< rog 'mountain, elevation' + peči 'to bake, heat'), thus referring to a sun-exposed location on a hill—which corresponds to the location of the village on the south flank of Goropeke Hill.

Church

The local church in the settlement is a 15th-century building with some later alterations. It is dedicated to John the Baptist and belongs to the Parish of Žiri.

References

External links

Goropeke on Geopedia

Populated places in the Municipality of Žiri